Acetone is an organic solvent.

Acetone may also refer to:

Acetone peroxide, an organic high explosive
Ace Tone, a manufacturer of musical instruments
Acetone (band), an alternative rock band
"Acetone", a song from the album Legion of Boom by The Crystal Method
Acetone (data page)